The Shire of Nannup is a local government area in the South West region of Western Australia, approximately  south of the state capital, Perth and  southeast of the coastal resort town of Busselton. Its seat of government is the town of Nannup, where about half of the Shire's population reside.

History

The Lower Blackwood Road District was established on 20 February 1890. It was renamed the Nannup Road District on 21 August 1925. On 1 July 1961, it became the Shire of Nannup following the passage of the Local Government Act 1960, which reformed all remaining road districts into shires.

Wards
The Shire is divided into three wards.

Central Ward (three councillors)
North Ward (three councillors)
South Ward (two councillors)

Towns and localities
The towns and localities of the Shire of Nannup with population and size figures based on the most recent Australian census:

(* indicates locality is only partially located within this shire)

Notable councillors
 Edmund Vernon Brockman, Nannup Roads Board member 1909–1935, 1937–1938, chairman 1915–1935; also a state MP

Heritage-listed places

As of 2023, 88 places are heritage-listed in the Shire of Nannup, of which three are on the State Register of Heritage Places.

References

External links
 

 
Nannup